Gourmet market may refer to:

Gourmet market, gourmet food industry
Gourmet Market, Thai supermarket chain